The Story of Boys & Girls is a 1989 Italian comedy-drama film directed by Pupi Avati. The film won the Silver Ribbons for best director and for best script and the David di Donatello for best screenplay.

Cast 
Felice Andreasi: Domenico
Lucrezia Lante della Rovere: Silvia
Alessandro Haber: Giulio, Silvia's father
Angiola Baggi: Maria
Davide Bechini: Angelo
Claudio Botosso: Taddeo
Enrica Maria Modugno: Linda
Anna Bonaiuto: Amelia, Angelo's mother
Massimo Bonetti: Baldo
Valeria Bruni Tedeschi: Valeria
Stefania Orsola Garello: Antonia, Angelo's sister
Marcello Cesena: Lele

References

External links

1989 films
Italian comedy-drama films
Films set in Italy
Films set in Emilia-Romagna
Films directed by Pupi Avati
Films scored by Riz Ortolani
1989 comedy-drama films
1989 comedy films
1989 drama films
1980s Italian films